Lausanne Airport, also known as Lausanne-Blécherette Airport, is a small civil airport located in the north of Lausanne, Switzerland. It has no scheduled commercial traffic and is used for general aviation. It also serves as a base for Swiss rescue services.

History 
The city established a runway in 1910. Henri Speckner was the first pilot to land here. A year later it created one of the first civil airports in Switzerland around the runway. A hangar for maintenance of aircraft was built west of the runway in 1914, next to a farm. Due to increased usage of the airport another one was built in 1922. Since 1933 operations have been controlled by Aéroport de la région lausannoise "La Blécherette" S.A.

At the close of World War II, Lausanne's municipal government made plans to develop a proper regional airport for the city. Blécherette was deemed unfit for such development and thus provision was made to expand the nearby field in Écublens and dispose of Blécherette. However, efforts to begin such development ultimately failed to materialize and Ecublens fell out of use, leaving Lausanne-Blécherette as the only remaining operational airport for the city. The nearest airport with scheduled service is Geneva Airport, which is connected to Lausanne via rail.

Infrastructure

Facilities
The airport features two maintenance hangars as well as a main building containing a restaurant. There is also a Boeing 737 simulator available.

Runway
In May 2000 the grass runway was replaced by a paved one (36/18). The runway has a slope, which means the maximum length for takeoff/landing varies depending on the direction between 775 and 805 m.

Ground transportation 
Lausanne Airport can be reached via the A9 motorway or public bus lines 1 and 21 of Transports publics de la région lausannoise. By car it's a ten-minute drive from the city center.

See also
 Transport in Switzerland

References

Notes

External links

 Official website

Airports in Switzerland
Buildings and structures in Lausanne
Transport in Lausanne